Niccolò Ghedini (22 December 1959 – 17 August 2022) was an Italian lawyer and politician who was the lawyer of the former prime minister, Silvio Berlusconi.

Ghedini was born in Padua on 22 December 1959. A member of the Italian Liberal Party from the late 1970s, he later joined Forza Italia following his long-time friend Giancarlo Galan. He was elected for the first time to the Chamber of Deputies in 2001.

From 2005, he was the regional coordinator of Forza Italia in Veneto.

Ghedini died of leukemia, in Milan, on 17 August 2022, at the age of 62.

References

1959 births
2022 deaths
Forza Italia politicians
Forza Italia (2013) politicians
The People of Freedom politicians
Italian Liberal Party politicians
Deputies of Legislature XIV of Italy
Deputies of Legislature XVI of Italy
Senators of Legislature XV of Italy
Senators of Legislature XVII of Italy
Senators of Legislature XVIII of Italy
University of Ferrara alumni
Politicians of Veneto
Deaths from leukemia
Deaths from cancer in Lombardy
21st-century Italian politicians